The Western Skou or Inner Skou languages form a branch of Skou languages. They are spoken in Sandaun Province, Papua New Guinea. They are called Western Skou by Donohue (2002), Inner Sko by Foley (2018), and West Vanimo Coast by Usher (2020).

The languages are,
Skou, Vanimo, Wutung, Leitre

References

 
Skou languages